Thoothukudi (formerly Tuticorin) is a port city, a municipal corporation and an industrial city in Thoothukudi district in the Indian state of Tamil Nadu. The city lies in the Coromandel Coast of Bay of Bengal. Thoothukudi is the capital and headquarters of Thoothukudi district. According to Confederation of Indian Industry, Thoothukudi has the second highest Human Development Index in Tamil Nadu next to Chennai. Thoothukudi City serves as the headquarters of Tamilnad Mercantile Bank Limited. Major educational establishments in the city include Government Thoothukudi Medical College, Fisheries College and Research Institute, Tamil Nadu Maritime Academy, V.O. Chidambaram College, Kamaraj College, Anna University (Thoothukudi Campus) and Government Polytechnic College. V. O. Chidambaranar Port Trust is one of the fastest growing Major Ports in India. Thoothukudi is an "Emerging Energy and Industrial hub of South India".

Thoothukudi is known as "Pearl City" due to the pearl fishing carried out in the town. It is a commercial seaport which serves the inland cities of Southern India and is one of the sea gateways of Tamil Nadu. It is also one of the major seaports in India with a history dating back to the 6th century CE. The city is believed to be of significant antiquity and has been ruled, at different times, by the Early Pandyas, Medieval Cholas, Later Cholas, Later Pandyas, Ma'bar Sultanate, Tirunelveli Sultanate, Vijayanagar Empire, Madurai Nayaks, Chanda Sahib, Carnatic kingdom, Portuguese, Dutch and the British. Thoothukudi was settled by the Portuguese, Dutch and later by the British East India Company. The urban agglomeration had a population of 410,760 .

The majority of the people of the city are employed in salt pans, sea-borne trading, fishing, and tourism. The 21 islands between Thoothukudi and Rameswaram shores in the Gulf of Mannar are noted as the first Marine Biosphere Reserve of India, and have around 36,000 species of flora and fauna. This protected area is called Gulf of Mannar Marine National Park. Our Lady of Snows Basilica festival is celebrated annually during August. This and the Shiva temple festivals, including Adi Amavasai, Sasti, and Chittirai chariot festivals, are the major festivals of the area. Roadways are the major mode of transport to Thoothukudi, while the city also has rail, air, and sea transport.

History

Thoothukudi is also known by the name 'Pearl city'. It is also called as "Sea Gateway of Tamil Nadu". Thoothukudi is part of the Pearl Fishery Coast, and is known for its pearl fishing and shipbuilding industries.

The ancient town of Korkai near present-day Thoothukudi has been a centre for maritime trade and pearl fishery for more than 2000 years. Ptolemy's geography refers to Korkai as a centre of pearl fishery while describing commercial relations between western India and Alexandria, the chief eastern emporium of the Roman Empire. The Periplus says that the Pandyan Empire  extended from Comari towards the north, including Korkai, where the pearl fisheries were. Eventually, the Vijayanagara Empire took over Thoothukudi. Conducted trade with the Portuguese. The  Empire split into Nayak kingdoms, who got overthrown by the Nawab of Arcot. The Nawab eventuality ceded the land to the British in 1801.

The Portuguese established ports in Thoothukudi during the 16th century, and the Dutch occupied these ports in the 17th century as evidenced by Pagoda coins. During the 18th century the British overpowered and occupied the town. Being a port town, the town received attention from the rulers for improving their trade, and so it was brought to Municipal status in 1866. Rao Bahadur Cruz Fernandez and J. L. P. Roche Victoria as the chairmen of municipal corporation made significant contributions, laying the foundations for a modern Thoothukudi.

On 20 October 1986, a new district, carved out of the erstwhile Tirunelveli district was born in Tamil Nadu and named after V. O. Chidambaranar, a prominent national leader hailing from Ottapidaram who led the Swadeshi Movement in the south. Since 1997, as is the case in other districts of Tamil Nadu, this district has been named after its headquarters town, Thoothukudi.

Thoothukudi became the citadel of freedom struggles in the early of the 20th century.

History of the ports

The major harbour of Thoothukudi is well known as a pearl diving and fishing centre. It is one of the oldest seaports in the world and was the seaport of the Pandyan kingdom after Korkai, near Palayakayal. It was later taken over by the Portuguese in 1548, captured by the Dutch in 1658, and ceded to the British in 1825. The lighthouse built in 1842 marked the beginning of the history of harbour development in the city. Thoothukudi was established as a Municipality in 1866 with Roche Victoria as its first chairman.

It attained the status of Corporation on 5 August 2008 after 142 years of being a municipality. Thoothukudi Corporation is divided into 60 wards after its expansion in the year 2011 and these wards are comprised in four zones—i.e., East, West, North, and South. East zone has 14–16 and 19–33 wards, West zone has 34–47 wards, North zone has 1–13 and 17, 18 wards and South zone has 48–60 wards.

The minor port of the Thoothukudi anchorage port with lighter age facilities has had flourishing traffic for over a century. The first wooden jetty of this port was commissioned in 1864. This port was used for export of salt, cotton yarn, senna leaves, palmyrah stalks, palmyrah fibres, dry fish, country drugs, and other goods to neighbouring countries and for import of coal, cotton, copra, pulses and grains. The minor port of the Thoothukudi has the distinction of being the intermediate port handling the highest traffic tonnage of over 1 million per annum.

Geography and climate
Thoothukudi is a port town situated in the Gulf of Mannar about  North of KanyaKumari and its environs form part of the coastal belt which forms a continuous stretch of the flat country relieved here and there by small rock outcrops. The region, surrounding Thoothukudi is liberally dotted with rain fed tanks. Red soils found on the southern side of the Thoothukudi town is composed quartz and variable quantities of fine red dry dust. The port is an all weather one. The bay formed by the Hare Island, Devils point and the main land gives ample protection to the lighters from monsoonal weather. The beach of Thoothukudi is featured with calm breeze and very low waves giving an image of a big river.

The hinterlands of the port of the city is connected to the districts of Madurai, Tirunelveli, Ramanathapuram and Tiruchirapalli. The city mostly has a flat terrain and roughly divided into two by the Buckle channel. The city has loose soil with thorny shrubs in the north and salt pans in the south.

Thoothukundi experiences a hot semi-arid climate (Köppen BSh) characterised by sweltering summers, hot winters and occasional heavy rain during the northeast monsoon. Summer extends from March to June when the climate is very humid. The city receives adequate rainfall only during the months of October and November. The city receives around  rainfall from the Northeast monsoon,  during summer,  during winter and  during the South-west monsoon season. The coolest month is January and the hottest months are from May to June. The city has a very high humidity being in the coastal sector.

The 21 islands between Thoothukudi and Rameswaram shores in the Gulf of Mannar are notified as the first Marine Biosphere Reserve of India. About 36,000 species of flora and fauna exist in the region covered with mangroves, sandy shores, sea grass beds that are conducive for turtle nesting. The region around the Thoothukudi shores are home to rare marine flora and fauna. Coral reefs and pearl oysters are some of the exotic species while algae, reef fish, holothurians, shrimps, lobsters, crabs and Mollusca are very common. Out of 600 recorded varieties of fish in the region, 72 are found to be commercially important. The thermal discharge from the thermal plants and excessive brine run off from the salt pans impact the flora and fauna in the region to a large extent.

Demographics

Thoothukudi was a port town during the period of Portuguese, Dutch and British in the 16th–19th centuries. The city expanded after 1907 due to the presence of public establishments. Residential and industrial growth was maximum around Palayamkottai and Ettaiyapuram roads between 1907 and 1930.

According to 2011 census, Thoothukudi city had a population of 237,830 with a sex-ratio of 1,010 females for every 1,000 males, much above the national average of 929. Thoothukudi had an average literacy rate of 92.10% with male literacy being 94.84%, and female literacy being 89.37%.

A total of 24,959 were under the age of six, constituting 12,684 males and 12,275 females. Scheduled Castes and Scheduled Tribes accounted for 7.42% and 0.1% of the population, respectively. The city had a total of 60,714 households. There were a total of 83,669 workers, comprising 114 cultivators, 154 main agricultural labourers, 1,498 in house hold industries, 77,420 other workers, 4,483 marginal workers, 69 marginal cultivators, 25 marginal agricultural labourers, 280 marginal workers in household industries and 4,109 other marginal workers.

At the time of the 2011 census, Thoothukudi urban agglomeration had a population of 411,628. A total of 42,756 of the population was under 6 years of age.

Tamil is the predominant language in the city and is spoken by almost 99% of the population. The dialect is the Thoothukudi Tamil which is related to Nellai Tamil. English is also widely spoken.

In Thoothukudi Municipal Corporation 65% of the population are Hindus, 30% Christians and 5% Muslims. In the urban agglomeration overall, 71% are Hindus, 25% Christians and 4% Muslims.

Economy

Salt pans in and around the city contribute majorly to the economy of the city. The salt pans produce 1.2 million tonnes of salt every year, contributing to 90% of the salt produced in the state and 50% needed by the chemical industries of the state. 

The other major industries are shipping, fishing, agricultural, power and chemical industries. Fishing is one of the largest contributor to the local economy. Thoothukudi Fishing Harbor is one of the oldest and largest harbors in Tamil Nadu. 

The Thoothukudi Thermal Power Station has five 210 MW generators. The first generator was commissioned in July 1979 and the newly built thermal power plant of 1000 MW by NLC and TANGEDCO, the NTPL Thermal Power Station. In addition to this there are several private power plants like Ind-Barath Thermal Power Limited, Coastal Energen Private Limited, Sterlite Industries Captive power plant. Thoothukudi Spinning Mills Ltd, Southern Petrochemical Industries Corporation, Thoothukudi Alkali Chemicals and Fertilizers Limited, Heavy Water Board Plant, Venus Home Appliances, S.K.S.C. Nadarajan & Bror, P. S. S. Krishnamurthi Exports Private Limited, Madura Coats Private Limited, DCW Limited, Kilburn Chemicals Ltd, Nila Sea foods, Diamond Sea foods 

Maris Associates, VVD Coconut oil mill, AVM oil mill, Ramesh flowers, Agsar Paints and KSPS Salts are some of the small scale and large scale industries in the city. Thoothukudi is the headquarters city of leading private sector bank Tamilnad Mercantile Bank Limited located. It is one of the fastest growing banks in India during the period of 2007–2012. Its total business is worth 360 billion. The bank targets a Total Business of 500 Billion INR in 2014–15. The city also has a research institute set up by Central Marine Fisheries Research Institute and a Spices laboratory set up by Spices Board of India.

Thoothukudi also has a State Industries Promotion Corporation of Tamil Nadu Industrial Estate and SIDCO's Industrial Estate which comprises several Small scale and Medium scale Industries. To cope with the increasing trade through Thoothukudi, the Government of India sanctioned the construction of an all-weather port at Thoothukudi. On 11 July 1974, the newly constructed V.O. Chidambaranar Port Authority was declared the tenth major port in India, second only to JN Port (Mumbai) in size. Thoothukudi is an artificial port. During the union budget of 2014–2015, the Central government sanctioned an 11,500 crore Outer Harbour Development Program for Thoothukudi port which is expected to give a push to the export-import sector in southern Tamil Nadu. The project would commence in 2015 and be completed by 2020. The DPR for Outer Harbour was released recently by the Union Shipping Minister. As a port city, almost all major logistics companies have set up office in Thoothukudi. The port also has a dedicated container terminal operated by PSA International. The port recently commenced the operation of 2nd Container Terminal by ABG (DBGIT) Pvt Ltd. The port handled 0.5 million TEU's in 2013–2014 to become third largest container port among Major Ports of India. The port is also a significant port due to the fact that it is located close to East-West International Sea Route. The port has direct cargo and container vessel connectivity to all major ports in the world like Colombo, Singapore, JNPT (Mumbai), Mundra, Jebel Ali, Salalah, Rotterdam, Karachi, Hong Kong and much more. This is the third international port in Tamil Nadu and its second all-weather port. The port also helps to increase the tourism in the region. A new ferry has been commenced between Thoothukudi and Colombo. The Station Commander, Indian Coast Guard Station Thoothukudi is located at Thoothukudi, Tamil Nadu under the operational and administrative control of the Commander, Coast Guard Region (East), Chennai. The Coast Guard Station Thoothukudi was commissioned on April 25, 1991, by Vice Admiral SW Lakhar, NM, VSM and then Director General Coast Guard. The Station Commander is responsible for Coast Guard operations in this area of jurisdiction in Gulf of Mannar.

Thoothukudi is the end point of the proposed Madurai-Thoothukudi Industrial Corridor. The study for this Corridor was completed by the Government of Tamil Nadu recently. The Corridor would consist of four manufacturing regions, one agri-business region, two business investment regions, a special tourism zone, one rural tourism hub and one knowledge hub. The government estimates that this Corridor would attract 1,900,000 crore industrial investment over a period of 10 years. The State Government recently formed a Special Purpose Vehicle (SPV) for Speedy implementation of the Project. The upcoming new railway line from Madurai to Thoothukudi via Aruppukotai, Ettayapuram would serve as the backbone for the development of this corridor.

Entertainment and leisure
Thoothukudi has All India Radio Station which Carries AIR External Services for South Asia in English, Sinhala and Tamil (1053 kHz). FM Radio Stations in Thoothukudi City include Suryan FM (93.5 MHz), Hello FM (106.4 MHz). Thoothukudi is the landing point for the first undersea cable of BSNL connecting Thoothukudi with Colombo.

The city has Tharuvai Multi Purpose Stadium which is maintained by Sports Development Authority of Tamil Nadu. Thoothukudi Gymkhana Club has two Synthetic Turf Tennis courts, Thoothukudi is the only other place after Chennai in Tamil Nadu to have this modern facility. Thoothukudi is known for its bakery items especially Macaroon. It is a light, baked confection including ingredients like almonds, coconuts and nuts. Thoothukudi macaroon is slightly different from European macaroons since it contains cashew as a main ingredient.

The Shankara Rameshwarar Udanurai Pagampriya Temple, Vaikundapathi Perumal Temple and Jamia Mosque in the centre of the town and the Our Lady of Snows Basilica in Kadarkarai Salai are the major religious attractions in the city. The church attracts lot of visitors around the country and is one of catholic pilgrimage centers in India dedicated to Virgin Mary. The church festival celebrated yearly during last week of July and first week of August, The Shiva temple festivals like Adi Amavasai, Sasti and Chittirai chariot festivals are the major festivals of the land.

Bharat Ratna Puratchi Thalaivar M.G.R. Park and Rajaji Park in Tamizh Salai, Nehruji Beach Park and Roche Park in Kadarkarai Salai, M.G.R. Park in Kamarajar Salai, Sankara Narayanan Park in Tooveypuram, Kakkan Park in Boltenpuram and State Bank Colony Park are the attracting corporation parks in the city.

Harbor Beach in Jawaharlal Nehru Salai and Muthu Nagar Beach in Kadarkarai Salai are the major beaches in the city. There are numerous islands located close to the city namely Hare Island (accessible by road), Nalla Thanni Island which attracts lot of visitors during weekends and festival seasons.
The creek opposite to Roche Park has an eco-park with Kayaking facilities that operates everyday from 6 AM to 6 PM. There are a variety of water sports activities in Muthu Nagar beach which includes Jet skiing, Water scooters, Wind surfing, Paddle surfing, Bump rides, Banana boat ride, Fishing, Snorkeling and Scuba diving.

KSPS Ganapathy Kalaiarangam, New Cleopatra Theatre, Perison Plaza Multiscreen, Sathya Theatre, and Sri Balakrishna Talkies are the movie theatres in the city for movie entertainment.

Transport

Thoothukudi has an extensive transport network and is well-connected to other major cities by road, rail, air and sea. The city has  concrete roads,  black topped surface roads,  water bound macadam roads and  earthen roads. The major roads within the city are Tamizh Salai connecting NH-138, Kamarajar Salai connecting NH-38, Ramanathapuram Road connecting SH-49, Tiruchendur Road connecting SH-176, V.O. Chidambaranar Salai and Victoria Extension Road. The highway V.O.C. Salai outside the city connects the Port Authority, Thermal Power Station, SPIC industry and NH-38. The city has two bus termini; Perarignar Anna Bus Terminus in Tamizh Salai and Thoothukudi New Bus Terminus in Kamarajar Salai. About 700 buses are operated from these two bus stands to local and inter cities.

The Tamil Nadu State Transport Corporation operates daily services connecting various cities to Thoothukudi. A new regional headquarters of TNSTC is being established in Thoothukudi which enables better transportation by government buses. The corporation operates a computerised reservation centre in the bus stand of the city. The State Express Transport Corporation operates long-distance buses connecting the city to important cities like Bengaluru, Chennai, Vellore, Nagapattinam and Kanniyakumari. Thoothukudi being a harbour city has lot of container truck transport. , the number of container trucks entering the city is 1000. The expansion of ECR from Thoothukudi to Kanniyakumari via Tiruchendur and Koodankulam at a cost of  2.57 billion sanctioned and is in progress.

Thoothukudi Railway Station is one of the oldest and popular railway stations in India. It is one of few stations in Southern Tamil Nadu to have Pitline facility for Cleaning and Maintenance of Rail Coaches facilitating the operation of Long distance Trains from Thoothukudi. The line between Madurai and Thoothukudi was opened in 1874. The lines connecting to Thoothukudi is being electrified recently. Thoothukudi has direct daily rail connectivity to Chennai, Mysore, Coimbatore, Okha, Tirunelveli. Vivek Express which connects Thoothukudi with Okha. Pearl City Express which connects Thoothukudi with Chennai Egmore Station is one of the Prestigious Trains of Southern Railway. An 8 Coach Link Train to Guruvayur Express has been introduced recently which connects Thoothukudi with Chennai during daytime. South Indian Railway began a Madras – Thoothukudi service connecting with the boat to Ceylon in 1899. The station was declared a Model Station in 2007 and several infrastructure developments are in process. There is also another station, known as Thoothukudi Melur.

Thoothukudi Airport is at Vagaikulam,  from the heart of the city. It has flights to Bengaluru and Chennai operated by IndiGo, it operate daily four services to Chennai and one trip to Bengaluru. The State Government and Airport Authority of India plans to extend the runway and modernise the airport to handle to more traffic and bigger aircraft. The land acquisition process is completed and AAI is ready to start the expansion works. A new Terminal has been planned and the runway is to expanded to facilitate the movement of Airbus A320 and Boeing 737s. There was also a proposal in 2009 for a greenfield airport. Madurai Airport is the nearest customs airport with daily international connections to Colombo and Dubai.

V.O. Chidambaranar Port Authority is an artificial deep-sea harbour. It is one of the major ports in India. A luxury ferry liner, the Scotia Prince, was operating a ferry service to Colombo, Sri Lanka. Ferry services between the two countries have been revived after more than 20 years.

Municipal administration and politics
Thoothukudi municipality was established in 1866 during British times. It was promoted to a municipal corporation on 5 August 2008, bringing an area of  within the city limits. The municipal corporation has four zones namely North, East, West and South. The corporation has 60 wards and there is an elected Councillor for each of those wards. The functions of the corporation are devolved into six departments: general administration/personnel, Engineering, Revenue, Public Health, city planning and Information Technology (IT). All these departments are under the control of a Municipal Commissioner who is the executive head. The legislative powers are vested in a body of 60 members, one each from the 60 wards. The legislative body is headed by an elected Mayor assisted by a Deputy mayor. Thoothukudi city is the headquarters of the Thoothukudi district.

Municipal Corporation Officials
Elected members

Commissioner

Thoothukudi comes under the Thoothukudi assembly constituency and it elects a member to the Tamil Nadu Legislative Assembly once every five years. From the 1952 elections, the assembly seat was won by Indian National Congress (INC) for five times during 1952, 1957, 1958, 1960, 1962 elections, Dravida Munnetra Kazhagam (DMK) for seven times during 1967, 1971, 1989, 1996, 2006, 2016, 2021 elections and All India Anna Dravida Munnetra Kazhagam (AIADMK) for six times during 1977, 1980, 1984, 1991, 2001, 2011 elections.
The Thoothukkudi Lok Sabha constituency was originally part of the Tirunelveli constituency and was delimited to Tirunelveli and Thoothukudi constituencies during 2009 Lok Sabha election. The constituency was formed after the 2008 delimitation with the following assembly constituencies: Vilathikulam, Thoothukkudi, Tiruchendur, Srivaikuntam, Ottapidaram and Kovilpatti.

Legislative Leaders
Elected Members

Education and utility services

There are 31 schools in Thoothukudi city, of which 10 are operated by the municipal corporation. There are 31 high schools and higher secondary schools, one of which is a government school. Tuticorin has high literacy rates and lower literacy rate gap between males and females. There are five arts and science colleges, three polytechnics in the city. It also has a Fisheries college in the outskirts affiliated to Tamil Nadu Dr. J. Jayalalithaa Fisheries University, Nagapattinam. There is one government and many private Engineering college affiliated to Anna University in the city and arts colleges on Tamizh Salai and Tiruchendur road. There is also a Government Medical college and Hospital. The colleges are affiliated to the Manonmaniam Sundaranar University in Tirunelveli. There are three Industrial Training Institutes (ITI) and about 50 computer training centres also. The city has Government Medical College Hospital and new ESI Hospital is being constructed at the Bypass road.

Electricity supply to the city is regulated and distributed by the Tamil Nadu Electricity Board (TNEB). Usage of Plastic polythene bags is banned inside corporation limits. Thoothukudi is the headquarters of the Thoothukudi region of TNEB that has four divisions. The city along with its suburbs forms the Thoothukudi Electricity Distribution Circle. A Chief Distribution engineer is stationed at the regional headquarters. Water supply is provided by the Thoothukudi City Corporation from the Tamirabarani with 8 overhead tanks. In the period 2010–2011, a total of 21 million litres of water was supplied everyday for households in the city.

About 96 metric tonnes of solid waste are collected from the city every day by door-to-door collection and subsequently the source segregation and dumping is carried out by the sanitary department of the Thoothukudi Municipal corporation. The coverage of solid waste management had efficiency of 94% . The underground drainage system was constituted in 1984 and covers only certain zones of the corporation area. The remaining sewerage system for disposal of sullage is through septic tanks and public conveniences. The corporation operates five health posts throughout the city. Apart from these, there are various private hospitals and clinics that take care of the health care needs of the citizens.

Thoothukudi comes under the Thoothukudi Telecom District of the Bharat Sanchar Nigam Limited (BSNL), India's state-owned telecom and internet services provider. Both Global System for Mobile Communications (GSM) and Code division multiple access (CDMA) mobile services are available. Apart from telecom, BSNL also provides broadband internet service. Thoothukudi is one of the few cities in India where BSNL's Caller Line Identification (CLI) based internet service Netone is available.

Environmental Issues 
Air Pollution is the major environmental challenge faced by Thoothukudi while water and noise pollution are environmental issues too. Thoothukudi is the only city from the state of Tamil Nadu to be listed as one of the Non-attainment cities by Ministry of Environment primarily on the basis of excess PM10 under the National Ambient Air Quality Monitoring Program (NAMP) for the period 2011 - 2015.

The city has a lot of red industries as a result of which the PM10 — tiny airborne particles seven times finer than human hair–exceeds national standards (60 micrograms per cubic metre, or μg/m3) by around 200 per cent. Indian Standards for PM10 is three times higher than WHO standards for PM10 particles which is 20 micrograms per cubic metre. Environmentalists blame public and private coal-fired thermal power plants, copper smelter and chemical industries for polluting the air quality of Thoothukudi.

A 2010 study published in the Journal of Ecobiotechnology cites Industrial pollution in Thoothukudi as a major cause for various health issues. Respondents of the study had various health issues like skin diseases, eye irritation, asthma, allergy, respiratory problems, cancer and hypertension. The study also observed that Industrial disposals and other chemical contaminates that enter waterways through agricultural runoff, storm water drains, and industrial discharges may persist in the environment for long periods and be transported by water or air over long distances. They disturbed the function of the endocrine system, resulting in reproductive, developmental, and behavioral problems. The endocrine disrupters reduced the fertility and increased the occurrence of still births, birth defects, and hormonally dependent Cancers such as breast, testicular, and prostate cancers. The effects on the developing nervous system can include impaired mental and psychomotor development, as well as cognitive impairment and behavior abnormalities. Studies like these led the people of Thoothukudi to protest for the closing of the Sterlite plant in May 2018. On the 22nd of that month, the police opened fire on protestors killing 13 and injuring 102. The plant was soon closed.

Research Institutes/Centres

There are many central and state government research institutes/centres also situated inside and outskirt of Thoothukudi city. Those are: Fisheries College and Research Institute (FCRI) outside on Harbour bybass road, Thoothukudi Research Centre of The Central Marine Fisheries Research Institute (CMFRI) on the Beach road, Suganthi Devadason Marine Research Institute (SDMRI) on Beach road, Outreach Centre of CSIR-Central Electrochemical Research Institute (CERI) in new harbour area, Thoothukudi and Sub-Regional office of The Marine Products Export Development Authority (MPEDA) in Millerpuram.

See also
 Thoothukudi Airport
 Thoothukudi massacre
 Thoothukudi Railway Station
 V.O. Chidambaranar Port Authority

Notes

References

External links

 Thoothukudiinfo
 Thoothukudi
 Thoothukudi Corporation
 V. O. Chidambaranar Port Trust

 
Former Portuguese colonies
Gulf of Mannar
Cities and towns in Thoothukudi district
Port cities in India